Beryllide is an intermetallic compound of beryllium with other metals, e.g. zirconium, tantalum, titanium, nickel, or cobalt.  Typical chemical formulae are Be12Ti and FeBe5.  These are hard, metal-like materials that display properties distinct from the constituents, especially with regards to their resilience toward oxidation.

Applications and potential applications
Beryllides of cobalt and nickel have metallurgical importance as the precipitated phase in beryllium copper alloys. These materials are nonsparking, which allows them to be used in certain hazardous environments.

In nuclear technology, beryllides are investigated as neutron multipliers.  Unlike metallic Be, materials such as Be12Ti are more resistant to oxidation by water but retain the neutron-multiplying properties of the predominant isotope 9Be.

References

External links 
 04.03-1980A, 900704, The Development of FeBe5 Fiber Using a Dual Plasma Deposition System
 Present status of beryllide R&D as neutron multiplier

Beryllium compounds
Intermetallics